Puerto Cortés is a small settlement on Isla Santa Margarita, off the Pacific coast of the Mexican state of Baja California Sur. It is part of Comondú Municipality. There is a naval base there. It is sometimes used as a breakpoint in metereological reports. The 2010 census reported no official resident population.

See also
Puerto Cortés Airstrip

References
 2010 census tables: INEGI

External links
Puerto Cortés (Maplandia)

Comondú Municipality
Populated places in Baja California Sur
Populated coastal places in Mexico